Atom is a system on a chip (SoC) platform designed for smartphones and tablet computers, launched by Intel in 2012. It is a continuation of the partnership announced by Intel and Google on September 13, 2011 to provide support for the Android operating system on Intel x86 processors. This range competes with existing SoCs developed for the smartphone and tablet market from companies such as Texas Instruments, Nvidia, Qualcomm and Samsung. Unlike these companies, which use ARM-based CPUs designed from the beginning to consume very low power, Intel has adapted the x86-based Intel Atom line of CPU developed for low power usage in netbooks, to even lower power usage.

Since April 2012, several manufacturers have released Intel Atom-based tablets and phones as well as using the SoCs as a basis for other small form factor devices (e.g. mini PCs and stick PCs).

In April 2016, Intel announced a major restructuring, including the cancellation of the SoFIA platform. It was reported by many news outlets that Broxton was cancelled.

List of systems

Merrifield and Moorefield smartphone platforms
In Q1 2014, Intel launched its fully Android compatible smartphone platform Merrifield based on a 22 nm SoC. It was followed by its platform refresh Moorefield in Q4 2014.

Operating system support on Cloverview
While Penwell SoC supports, in addition to Microsoft Windows, both Linux and Android operating systems, Intel has announced that it will not provide support for Linux on Cloverview family of Atom systems-on-a-chip. This announcement has caused strong negative reaction from open source proponents. A few days later Intel issued a statement saying that it has “plans for another version of this platform directed at Linux/Android" The initial Clover Trail platform only supported Microsoft Windows (z27x0 series). The Clover Trail+ platform was later released targeting Google Android (z25x0 series).

The last version of Windows 10 to support Cloverview is the Anniversary Update (version 1607) until January 10, 2023 when the last public security patch KB5022289 was released; later versions of Windows 10 and all versions of Windows 11 cannot be installed.

New power states on Cloverview

Z2760 Cloverview has introduced two new power states: S0i1 and S0i3. The S0i1 state is intended to be used when the display is on but the user does not actively interact with the device; it consumes power in mW range, and can be entered/left in microseconds. The S0i3 state is intended to be used when the device display is off; it consumes power in microwatt range, and can be entered/left in milliseconds. As a result, Intel claims longer standby battery life (up to three weeks for a typical tablet).

Roadmap

In May 2011, Intel announced an accelerated roadmap for Atom SoC. The 22 nm Silvermont microarchitecture was scheduled for 2013 release, and release of the 14 nm Airmont microarchitecture was scheduled for 2014.

It has been reported that Silvermont-based Atom SoCs will be codenamed Tangier (Merrifield smartphones), Valleyview (Bay Trail tablets), will be available in single-, dual- and quad-core versions, and Valleyview will include Intel's 7th generation GPU, allowing for 4–7× improvement over existing Atom GPUs.

Other upcoming Silvermont-based Atom SoCs include Rangeley and Avoton (part of Edisonville platform).

Airmont-based Atom platforms will be codenamed Moorefield (smartphones) and Cherry Trail (tablets) using the Anniedale and Cherryview SoCs.

Goldmont-based Atom platforms were to be codenamed Morganfield (smartphones) and Willow Trail (tablets) using the Broxton SoC. The Willow Trail SoC platform was cancelled in April 2016, as Broxton is limited to IoT devices.

Similar SoCs
Apple silicon by Apple
Exynos by Samsung
Jaguar and Puma by AMD
NovaThor by ST-Ericsson
OMAP by Texas Instruments
Snapdragon by Qualcomm
Tegra by Nvidia
R-Car by Renesas
Dolphin by Telechips
Vortex86 by DMP Electronics

See also

Mobile Internet device: Intel MID platforms
Tablet computer: Intel tablet platforms
Mobile Internet device
List of Intel Atom microprocessors
Bonnell and Saltwell microarchitectures
Silvermont and Airmont microarchitectures
Comparison of Intel graphics processing units
Allwinner
Rockchip
MIPS architecture
Intel 80386EX (one of Intel's first SoCs)
Tolapai (Intel's earlier SoC not marketed as Atom)
Intel Quark
Intel Edison

References

Intel products
System on a chip